TPQ may refer to:

 Terminus post quem,  the earliest possible date (used to give an approximate date for an event or text)
 Amado Nervo International Airport, Tepic, Nayarit, Mexico, IATA airport code:
 Tridimensional Personality Questionnaire (TPQ)